This is a list of submissions to the 68th Academy Awards for Best Foreign Language Film. The Academy Award for Best Foreign Language Film was created in 1956 by the Academy of Motion Picture Arts and Sciences to honour non-English-speaking films produced outside the United States. The award is handed out annually, and is accepted by the winning film's director, although it is considered an award for the submitting country as a whole. Countries are invited by the Academy to submit their best films for competition according to strict rules, with only one film being accepted from each country.

For the 68th Academy Awards, forty-one films were submitted in the category Academy Award for Best Foreign Language Film. The submission deadline was set on November 1, 1995. Bolivia and Tunisia submitted films for the first time. The Philippines returned to the competition after a nine-year absence. Iran unsuccessfully tried to withdraw the film from contention, but the Academy refused to accept the withdrawal. The bolded titles were the five nominated films, which came from Algeria, Brazil, Italy, the Netherlands and Sweden. The eventual winner was feminist comedy Antonia's Line from the Netherlands.

Submissions

References

68